The tennis competition at the 2002 Central American and Caribbean Games was held in San Salvador, El Salvador.

Medal summary

Men's events

Women's events

Mixed event

References

Central American and Caribbean Games
2002 Central American and Caribbean Games
2002